Love Over-Due is the 55th studio album by American musician James Brown. The album was released on July 23, 1991, by Scotti Bros. Records.

Track listing
All tracks composed by James Brown; except where indicated

References

1991 albums
James Brown albums
Albums produced by James Brown
Scotti Brothers Records albums